Nogometni Klub Vir is a Croatian football club, which plays in the town of Vir near Posušje. They currently play in the Druga liga FBiH Jug.
Season 2007/08. again finished second last on the 14th in the Second League South as the previous season, but unlike then, Vir was knocked out in the inter-county league. After four seasons with the inter-county league back to the Second League in the South, but before the start of the season, giving up on the competition because of financial problems.

Football clubs in Bosnia and Herzegovina
Croatian football clubs in Bosnia and Herzegovina
1978 establishments in Bosnia and Herzegovina